Donghu Station may refer to:

 Donghu Station (Guangzhou), a station of the Guangzhou Metro
 Donghu Station (Taipei Metro), a station of the Taipei Metro